To Selena, With Love (Spanish: Para Selena, Con Amor) is a 2012 book on the life of American singer Selena and her spouse Chris Pérez. Written 17 years, after Selena's death, Perez describes their relationship from how they met, their marriage, and struggles along with Selena's success as an entertainer and fashion designer up until her murder in 1995. Perez also dispels the rumors about Selena being pregnant when she passed, misconceptions about her murder, and her relationship with her family.

References 

 

Cultural depictions of Selena